Osowa is a district of Gdańsk, Poland.

Osowa may also refer to the following places:
Osowa, Lublin County in Lublin Voivodeship (east Poland)
Osowa, Podlaskie Voivodeship (north-east Poland)
Osowa, Łódź Voivodeship (central Poland)
Osowa, Włodawa County in Lublin Voivodeship (east Poland)
Osowa, Świętokrzyskie Voivodeship (south-central Poland)
Osowa, Masovian Voivodeship (east-central Poland)